State Highway 51, abbreviated to SH-51 or OK-51, is a major state highway in Oklahoma, United States. It is the third-longest state highway in the system.

Route description

Texas to I-35

SH-51 begins at the Texas line concurrent with US-60 just east of Higgins, Texas. It remains concurrent for 61 miles (98 km) until it reaches US-270/US-281/SH-3 at Seiling, Oklahoma. At Seiling, SH-51 joins with those three highways for nine miles (14 km) before splitting off on its own.

 after splitting off, Highway 51 meets SH-58 in Canton. It then continues east, crossing the North Canadian River and meeting SH-51A before turning
northeast toward Okeene, where it intersects SH-8. SH-51 will go for  before intersecting another highway.

In Hennessey SH-51 meets US-81 before continuing eastward.  later, it meets SH-74 north of Crescent.  to the east, it shares a brief concurrency with US-77;  later it has an interchange at Interstate 35 at Exit 174.

I-35 to Tulsa
After crossing I-35, SH-51 becomes a multilane highway and a major corridor linking I-35 to Stillwater, the home of Oklahoma State University. Along this  stretch is an intersection with SH-86. When SH-51 reaches Stillwater, it meets US-177.

Continuing east from Stillwater, the road returns to a two-lane highway after sharing a  concurrency with SH-108  and intersects with SH-18  later.  east of this, it passes through Yale, Oklahoma before crossing SH-99. It becomes a multilane highway again after SH-48. It turns into the "Mannford Freeway" before passing through the small towns of Mannford and Lotsee on its way toward the Tulsa area.

Tulsa and beyond
In Sand Springs, SH-51 crosses the Arkansas River with SH-97 before merging onto the Sand Springs Expressway (US-412/US-64). When this
freeway ends at I-244 near downtown Tulsa, SH-51 merges onto I-244 southbound only to exit  later, where it runs concurrent with US-64/US-75. This freeway is actually Interstate 444, but the route is not signed as such. After one more mile, SH-51 leaves the interstate with US-64 and becomes the Broken Arrow Expressway, a freeway running northwest–southeast through Tulsa which is known as "The BA" by locals and local media. US-64 leaves the freeway as a concurrency with US-169 southbound. Later, SH-51 will exit the freeway and become a four-lane highway toward Coweta. The mainline freeway becomes the Muskogee Turnpike.

At Coweta, SH-51 turns back east after heading southeast through the Tulsa area. After crossing the Muskogee Turnpike again and bridging the Verdigris River the highway soon enters Wagoner, where it junctions with US-69. Returning once again to a 2-lane road, Highway 51 crosses Ft. Gibson Lake and the town of Hulbert.  later, it passes through Tahlequah, where it has a brief concurrency with US-62/SH-10. After spitting with these highways, it heads southeast toward Stilwell, Oklahoma, running concurrent with US-59 for a mile on the way. After leaving Stilwell it provides access to Adair State Park, and then crosses the Arkansas line becoming Arkansas Highway 244, which quickly connects to Arkansas Highway 59.

History
SH-51 was originally commissioned on June 1, 1927 as a connector from Stilwell to Eldon at SH-27 (present-day US-62). By 1928, it had been extended to Tulsa. On June 15, 1933, it was extended to the east to the Arkansas state line, where it became AR-45.

ODOT extended SH-51 west to Stillwater and Perry (via a segment of roadway currently serving as US-177). On March 18, 1935, the section from Stillwater to Perry was rescinded and SH-51 was extended to SH-8 at Okeene. It was then extended to Seiling on October 18, 1938. On March 23, 1943, it was extended to the Texas state line by a concurrency with US-60.

The Broken Arrow Expressway was built in the early 1960s and opened in 1964. It was not, however, officially named the Broken Arrow Expressway until July 6, 1999  by H.B. 1455.

The steel truss bridge carrying SH-51 across Stillwater Creek west of Stillwater, once considered the gateway into the city, was removed on March 25, 2008. In a first for the state of Oklahoma, the bridge, originally built in 1936, was sold to Payne County for $200,000 and transferred to a county road east of Stillwater, where it was installed over Council Creek.

Major intersections

Spurs
Like many in the Oklahoma state highway system, SH-51 has short spurs branching from it that bear the "51" number with a lettered suffix:

 SH-51A runs from SH-58 northeast of Canton to SH-8 near Roman Nose State Park. It is the longest suffixed highway in the system.
 SH-51B connects Coweta to US-69 north of Muskogee. It goes through the towns of Porter and Tullahassee. 
 SH-51C (decommissioned) connected SH-51 west of Stillwater to Carl Blackwell Lake until it was decommissioned in 2005.
 SH-51D (decommissioned) connected SH-51 south of Sand Springs with I-244 in Tulsa, running along Avery Drive and West 21st Street. It appeared on some ODOT maps as late as the 1970s, but is no longer shown. 
It is currently the newest Oklahoma state highway.

See also

References

External links

 SH-51 at Roadklahoma

051
Transportation in Tulsa, Oklahoma
Transportation in Ellis County, Oklahoma
Transportation in Dewey County, Oklahoma
Transportation in Blaine County, Oklahoma
Transportation in Kingfisher County, Oklahoma
Transportation in Logan County, Oklahoma
Transportation in Payne County, Oklahoma
Transportation in Creek County, Oklahoma
Transportation in Tulsa County, Oklahoma
Transportation in Wagoner County, Oklahoma
Transportation in Cherokee County, Oklahoma
Transportation in Adair County, Oklahoma